Newgrange is a neolithic prehistoric site in County Meath, Ireland.

Newgrange or New Grange or variation,  may also refer to:

 "Newgrange" (song), a 1982 song by 'Clannad' off the album Magical Ring
 "Newgrange (Bru Na Boinne)" (song), a song by 'Wolfe Tones'; see 25th Anniversary (Wolfe Tones album)
 Newgrange dog, a prehistoric neolithic breed of dog known from archaeological evidence
 Newgrange School, Hopewell, New Jersey, USA
 New Grange, a locality in Tobago, Trinidad and Tobago

See also

 "Bethel/New Grange", an electoral district in Tobago

 Grange (disambiguation)
 Oldgrange (disambiguation)